Fachtna mac Folachtan (died 723) was Abbot of Clonfert. 

Fachtna mac Folachtan is the third recorded abbot, including Brendan. Neither his immediate predecessors or successors are known with certainty.

References

 Annals of Ulster at CELT: Corpus of Electronic Texts at University College Cork
 Annals of Tigernach at CELT: Corpus of Electronic Texts at University College Cork
Revised edition of McCarthy's synchronisms at Trinity College Dublin.
 Byrne, Francis John (2001), Irish Kings and High-Kings, Dublin: Four Courts Press, 
 Lysaght, Eamonn (1978), The Surnames of Ireland. , pp.233-34.

People from County Galway
8th-century Irish priests
723 deaths
Year of birth unknown